Sayantani Ghosh (born 6 September 1984) is an Indian television actress. She debuted into Hindi television with the long running soap opera Kumkum – Ek Pyara Sa Bandhan and is best known for starring in the successful TV shows Naaginn, Mahabharat, Naamkarann, Tera Yaar Hoon Main   and Naagin 4. In 2012, she participated in  Bigg Boss 6.

Early life and career
Sayantani Ghosh won the Miss Calcutta beauty pageant and found roles in Bengali films before obtaining her first television role in 2002, in the Indian soap opera Kumkum – Ek Pyara Sa Bandhan.

After four years in that supporting role she joined the main cast of Naaginn as Amrita for two years followed by the guest role of Prosecutor Pranali Gujral on Adaalat. Same year, she played the lead role of Kakul Samman Chaudhary in Ghar ek sapna.

Ghosh participated in the sixth season of  Bigg Boss 6, the Indian version of UK reality show Big Brother, and was evicted from the house in the third week.

In 2013 she appeared in the main cast of epic television series Mahabharat in the role of Satyavati, a fisher-woman who later became the emperor's wife. In 2014 Ghosh portrayed an antagonist in Itna Karo Na Mujhe Pyaar and became a contestant on Dare 2 Dance.

In 2015, Ghosh played the supporting role of Rajkumari Rajeshwari in Sasural Simar Ka. She then appeared in Rishton Ka Mela, Comedy Nights with Kapil and Comedy Classes. At the end of 2015 Ghosh was cast as lead antagonist Poulomi Maa in  Santoshi Maa. In 2016 she joined the main cast of romantic drama Naamkaran, playing Neela Parikh until her character's death in February 2018.

In 2019, Ghosh made her theatre debut in a stage play called Ovee- A Haunted Hostel.. She then appeared in Sanjivani as Dr. Anjali Gupta

In 2020, she made a cameo appearance in Barrister Babu as Rasiya Bai.

In December 2020, she replaced Shweta Gulati's character Jhanvi Bansal in the Sony SAB series Tera Yaar Hoon Main and entered the show as Daljeet Bagga, the new female lead. Her character was shown to marry Rajeev (Sudeep Sahir), the male lead, under a certain situation. In 2021, she won the 'Favourite Lokpriya Sadasya' award from Gold Comedy Awards for her role as Daljeet Bagga in Tera Yaar Hoon Main.

Personal life 
Sayantani Ghosh married her long-time boyfriend Anugrah Tiwari on 6 December 2021.

In January 2022, Ghosh tested positive for COVID-19 along with her husband. She took a brief break from shooting and quarantined herself. Some time later, she recovered and tested negative for COVID-19, post which she resumed shooting for show.

Filmography

Television

References

External links

 
 

Actresses from Kolkata
Living people
Indian television actresses
Actresses in Hindi television
21st-century Indian actresses
Bigg Boss (Hindi TV series) contestants
1984 births